The Church of Saint George and the Mosque of Al-Khidr are two houses of worship from Lod, Israel, built next to each other on top of and embedding the remains of Byzantine- and Crusader-period predecessors of the current church building.

The Church of Saint George ("Church of Saint George, slayer of the dragon") is a 19th-century Greek Orthodox church commemorating the fourth-century Christian martyr Saint George. The current 19th-century church is based on a partially rebuilt Crusader-period church, which had itself been built over the remains and footprint of a Byzantine-period predecessor. 

The Mosque of El-Khidr is a 13th-century (Mamluk-period) mosque, containing elements of both the Byzantine ecclesiastic complex and the Crusader cathedral. The mosque is dedicated to El-Khadr, a Muslim holy figure or ghawth often associated with Saint George.

History

Byzantine establishment
The church of Saint George was first established in Lod by the Byzantines and stood in the 5th-7th centuries. It was probably shaped as a basilica whose three aisles terminated at the east end in semi-circular apses. Beside the main church, the complex also contained a second, smaller one just southwest of it. The Christian site was destroyed in 614 by the Sasanids during the war which led to them conquering Jerusalem.

The Byzantine basilica may have had just one apse with two irregular pastophoria (chambers).

Crusader cathedral

The Crusaders established their cathedral at the exact site of the main Byzantine church, reusing some of its surviving masonry, and having the same internal measurements of 47 metres east to west, and 24 metres north to south. The three-aisled basilica also terminated in three semi-circular apses, with the second of five bays forming the transept. In 1177, a detachment of Saladin's army attacked the town and the inhabitants survived by taking refuge on the roof of the fortified church, which seems to indicate that by this time it had a stone roof.

After reconquering the land from the Crusaders in the aftermath of the 1187 Battle of Hattin, Saladin had the cathedral of Lydda and castle of Ramla demolished in 1191. The territory around Lydda changed hands repeatedly during the next eight decades, and the state of the church during this time is not clearly documented, with nothing to support the notion that it was rebuilt by Richard the Lionhearted. It seems that the Greek Orthodox continued using the still standing eastern part of the church, with the choir and the tomb of St George, possibly along with the smaller buildings southwest of the ruined cathedral. In 1266 Lydda fell to the Mamluk sultan Baibars. Clermont-Ganneau speculated that the Frankish materials present in secondary use at the nearby Jindas Bridge (1273) were taken from the demolished part of the Lydda church, which Adrian Boas sees as part of the wider Mamluk custom of marking the triumph over the Christians by recycling their masonry for their own constructions.

Mamluk mosque
During the Mamluk period, the ruined western part of the Crusader church has been converted into a congregational mosque, the earliest mention of which comes from the early 15th century. The remains of the smaller Byzantine basilica southwest of the main church, including its apse, were incorporated into the mosque's prayer hall; today a pillar that once stood in the nave of the basilica remains inside the mosque prayer hall with an inscription in Greek. Above the entrance to the mosque is an inscription dating its construction to June 1269 (Ramadan 667), as instructed by Baibars.

The northern façade of the mosque building faces the courtyard (sahn), and makes use of the south wall of the Crusader church. The mosque itself is built as a length hall divided into three by two rows of four pillars each. Its ceiling is vaulted and made in the shape of a cross. On the eastern side of the prayer hall remains a remnant of a Byzantine apse. Beneath the mosque are underground halls, built by the Crusaders and used as reservoirs for the church and city residents. The mosque and minaret were mentioned by Felix Fabri in the 1480s:
"The rest of the church has been cut off from the choir by a wall, and they have made that part of it into a fair mosque in honour of Mahomet, and adorned it with a lofty tower. The door stood over against us, so that we could see into the courtyard of the mosque, and into the mosque itself, and it was like Paradise for cleanliness and beauty."

In the Ottoman period, the entrance to the courtyard of the mosque was located on its western wall, but it was later moved to its northern side.

19th-century church

The current Church of St. George incorporates only the northeast corner of the original site. During the second part of the nineteenth century, the Greek Orthodox Patriarchate of Jerusalem received permission from the Ottoman authorities to build a church on the site of the medieval ruins. The 19th-century church was built over the remains of the 12th-century Crusader structure, occupying the east end of its nave and northern aisle, from which the corresponding two apses survive.

The Ottoman authorities stipulated that part of the church plot be incorporated in the  mosque courtyard. The southern part of the Crusader church dictated the shape of the mosque courtyard.

The church crypt contains a sarcophagus venerated as a symbolic tomb of St George.

Gallery

Combined site

Mosque

Church

Bibliography

 (pp. 102-109)
 (pp. 267-8)
 (p. 330)
 (pp. 210-211)
 (pp. 49-55)

See also
 Saint George in devotions, traditions and prayers
 St. George's Cathedral, Jerusalem, an Anglican church in Jerusalem
 Monastery of Saint George, al-Khader, a Greek Orthodox monastery near Bethlehem
Religion in Israel

References

External links

 
 
 
 
Photos of the Church at the Manar al-Athar photo archive

Saint George (martyr)
Greek Orthodox churches in Israel
Buildings and structures in Central District (Israel)
Lod
Churches completed in 1872
1872 establishments in Ottoman Syria
Church-Mosques